Melanophryniscus devincenzii is a species of toad in the family Bufonidae.
It is found in Argentina, Uruguay, possibly Brazil, and possibly Paraguay.
Its natural habitats are subtropical or tropical moist lowland forests, subtropical or tropical seasonally wet or flooded lowland grassland, intermittent rivers, rocky areas, and plantations.  It is threatened by habitat loss.

References

devincenzii
Amphibians described in 1968
Taxonomy articles created by Polbot